John de Ros may refer to:

John de Ros, 5th Baron de Ros
John de Ros, 7th Baron de Ros

See also
 John Roos, American lawyer